Vice-Admiral Fitzroy Henry Lee (2 January 1699 – 14 April 1750) was a British Royal Navy officer who served as Commodore Governor of the Colony of Newfoundland.

Lee supposedly inspired the character "Hawser Trunnion" in Tobias Smollett's novel, The Adventures of Peregrine Pickle.

Life
Lee was the seventh son of Edward Henry Lee, 1st Earl of Lichfield, and Lady Charlotte Fitzroy, Charles II's illegitimate daughter.

Lee was born in Oxfordshire, England. He entered the Royal Navy in 1716, and obtained a promotion to lieutenant in 1722.

Around 1746, the Navy relieved Lee of command, based on charges of debauchery and drunkenness. A pending promotion to rear-admiral was suspended.  However, in October 1747, when Lee arrived back in England, the Navy reinstated his promotion, effective 15 July 1747. On 12 May 1748, Lee was promoted to vice-admiral of the white, but he had no further service,

Lee died suddenly on 14 April 1750.

See also
Governors of Newfoundland
List of people from Newfoundland and Labrador

References

Attribution

External links
 
Biography at Government House The Governorship of Newfoundland and Labrador

1699 births
1750 deaths
Governors of Newfoundland Colony
Royal Navy vice admirals
Younger sons of earls